LightGBM, short for light gradient-boosting machine, is a free and open-source distributed gradient-boosting framework for machine learning, originally developed by Microsoft. It is based on decision tree algorithms and used for ranking, classification and other machine learning tasks. The development focus is on performance and scalability.

Overview
The LightGBM framework supports different algorithms including GBT, GBDT, GBRT, GBM, MART and RF. LightGBM has many of XGBoost's advantages, including sparse optimization, parallel training, multiple loss functions, regularization, bagging, and early stopping. A major difference between the two lies in the construction of trees. LightGBM does not grow a tree level-wise — row by row — as most other implementations do. Instead it grows trees leaf-wise. It chooses the leaf it believes will yield the largest decrease in loss. Besides, LightGBM does not use the widely-used sorted-based decision tree learning algorithm, which searches the best split point on sorted feature values, as XGBoost or other implementations do. Instead, LightGBM implements a highly optimized histogram-based decision tree learning algorithm, which yields great advantages on both efficiency and memory consumption. The LightGBM algorithm utilizes two novel techniques called Gradient-Based One-Side Sampling (GOSS) and Exclusive Feature Bundling (EFB) which allow the algorithm to run faster while maintaining a high level of accuracy.

LightGBM works on Linux, Windows, and macOS and supports C++, Python, R, and C#. The source code is licensed under MIT License and available on GitHub.

Gradient-based one-side sampling 
Gradient-based one-side sampling (GOSS) is a method that leverages the fact that there is no native weight for data instance in GBDT.  Since data instances with different gradients play different roles in the computation of information gain, the instances with larger gradients will contribute more to the information gain. So to retain the accuracy of the information, GOSS keeps the instances with large gradients and randomly drops the instances with small gradients.

Exclusive feature bundling 
Exclusive feature bundling (EFB) is a near-lossless method to reduce the number of effective features. In a sparse feature space many features are nearly exclusive, implying they rarely take nonzero values simultaneously. One-hot encoded features are a perfect example of exclusive features. EFB bundles these features, reducing dimensionality to improve efficiency while maintaining a high level of accuracy. The bundle of exclusive features into a single feature is called an exclusive feature bundle.

See also
 Machine learning
 ML.NET
 Data binning
 Gradient boosting
 XGBoost
 CatBoost
 scikit-learn

References

Further reading

External links
 GitHub - microsoft/LightGBM
 LightGBM - Microsoft Research

Applied machine learning
Applications of artificial intelligence
Data mining and machine learning software
Free and open-source software
Microsoft free software
Microsoft Research
Open-source artificial intelligence
Software using the MIT license
2016 software